Graphium antheus, the large or larger striped swordtail, is a species of butterfly in the family Papilionidae (swallowtails), found in tropical and sub-Saharan Africa.

Description
The wingspan is 65–70 mm in males and 70–75 mm in females.The transverse bars in the cell of the forewing all separated; the apical spot in the cell of the hindwing above completely separated from the median band of the cell by the black ground-colour; the middle cell of the hindwing beneath with a deep black and red spot. The larva is brown to brown-green with a 
yellow belt on the third segment and lives on Artabotrys, an Anonacea. Sierra Leone to Angola. — In ab.evombaroides Eim.  the apical spot of the cell of the hindwing above is more or less united with the median band; otherwise not different from antheus. West Africa. — In ab. utuba Hamps. the fourth and fifth transverse bands in the cell of the forewing are united posteriorly, forming a U-shaped spot; otherwise agreeing with nyassae. Delagoa and British East Africa. — nyassae Btlr. has the middle cell of the hindwing beneath without the black and red spot; the transverse bars in the coll of the fore wing separated. Natal to British East Africa. — ab. (var. ?) lurlinus Btlr. is somewhat larger than antheus and has the green markings of the upperside more extended, especially the transverse bars in the cell of the fore wing and the 
submarginal spots of both wings are nearly twice as large as in the latter. Nyassaland and in the neighbourhood of Victoria Nyanza. mercutius Sm. & Kirby. Markings of the upper surface yellowish white; second and third transverse bands and again fourth and fifth transverse bands united to form a large, almost quadrate spot; the hindwing on both surfaces with a red spot in 1 c and 2 and beneath also with a red dot in cellule 7; the cell of the hinclwing on the other hand without red or black spot. Only one specimen known. Is perhaps only an aberration of the female of nyassae. Delagoa Bay.

Biology
The flight period is year-round, peaking from November to December.

The larva feeds on Uvaria caffra, Artabotrys monteiroae, Annona reticulata, Annona senegalensis, Artabotrys brachypetalus, Cleistochlamys kirkii, Hexalobus monopetalus, Landolphia ugandensis, Monanthotaxis caffra, Monodora junodi, and Uvaria kirkii.

Taxonomy
Graphium antheus is the nominal member of the  antheus - clade (antheus, Graphium evombar , Graphium kirbyi, Graphium junodi, Graphium polistratus, Graphium colonna, Graphium illyris, Graphium gudenusi).

Aurivillius in Seitz places evombar and antheus in the policenes Group Subgroup 1 circumscribed-Hindwing with a long, narrow tail of uniform width at vein 4. Frons black with white lateral margins. Wings above with green or greenish white markings. Cell of the forewing with 5 — 6 transverse bands or spots.Both wings with submarginal spots. Hindwing beneath with a so-called ornamental band, formed of red spots. Besides the markings already mentioned the forewing has a spot at the base of cellules 1 a and 1 b, an oblique transverse streak in the basal part of these cellules and 8 discal spots, one each in cellules 1 a — 6 and 8; the hindwing has a narrow transverse band at the base, a narrow median band which consists only of three spots 
(in the cell and in cellules 2 and 7) and usually also 7 discal spots in cellules 1 c -7, of which, however, that in 1 c is red. The larva has four pairs of spines, one pair each on the 1., 2., 3. and penultimate segments. The pupa is very angularly widened at the beginning of the abdomen and has a long hump on the mesothorax. 
Subgroup 1.Hindwing in the apex of the cell with an additional light spot which is sometimes more or less united with the spot of the median band. The discal spot in cellule 3 of the hindwing is elongated and nearly or quite reaches the base of the cellule. Wings beneath spotted with red at the extreme basal margin. Cell of the forewing behind the fifth transverse streak unicolorous, without spots.

References

Carcasson, R.H 1960 The Swallowtail Butterflies of East Africa (Lepidoptera,Papilionidae). Journal of the East Africa Natural History Society pdf Key to East Africa members of the species group, diagnostic and other notes and figures. (Permission to host granted by The East Africa Natural History Society

antheus
Butterflies of Africa
Butterflies described in 1779